Belaya Gora is a rural locality (a village) in Kholmogorsky District, Arkhangelsk Oblast, Russia. The population was 1 as of 2012.

References 

Rural localities in Kholmogorsky District